Fakarava Airport is an airport serving the island of Fakarava in French Polynesia . The airport is 3.5 km west of the village of Rotoava. It is located northeast of Papeete, the Tahitian Capital.

Airlines and destinations

References

External links
 Atoll list (in French)
 Classification of the French Polynesian atolls by Salvat (1985)

Airports in French Polynesia
Atolls of the Tuamotus